Vahid Nouri (born 31 May 1989) is an Iranian Paralympic judoka. At the 2020 Summer Paralympics, he won a gold medal in the men's 90 kg event.

References

External links 
 Vahid Nouri on Instagram
 
 

1989 births
Living people
Iranian male judoka
Paralympic judoka of Iran
Paralympic gold medalists for Iran
Paralympic medalists in judo
Judoka at the 2020 Summer Paralympics
Medalists at the 2020 Summer Paralympics
Sportspeople from Tehran
21st-century Iranian people